This is a list of notable people who studied at the Central School of Art and Design in London, previously known as the Central School of Arts and Crafts, from its foundation in 1854 up to the time of its amalgamation with Saint Martin's School of Art in 1989.

A
 Salomon van Abbé
 Faisal Abdu'Allah
 Tate Adams
 Eric Aho
 Rosemary Allan
 Edward Allington
 Athene Andrade
 Pegaret Anthony
 Tanya Ashken
 Duffy Ayers
 Robert Ayton (illustrator)

B
 Irene Bache
 Gordon Baldwin
 Nadine Baylis
 John Berger
 Sebastian Bergne
 Alfred Bestall
 Noel Betowski
 Pearl Binder
 Helen Binyon
 Derek Birdsall
 Maria Björnson
 Edmund Blampied
 Sue Blane
 Brian Bolland
 Gregoire Boonzaier
 Dorothea Braby
 Raymond Briggs
 Alison Britton
 Peter Brookes
 Lez Brotherston
 John Burningham
 A. S. Byatt

C
 Alan Caiger-Smith
 Corrie Cameron
 Sokari Douglas Camp
 Joanna Carrington
 David Carter (industrial designer)
 Bryan Charnley
 Alison Chitty
 Bunny Christie
 Mary Chubb
 Kevin Coates
 Sebastian Conran
 Terence Conran
 John Kingsley Cook
 Jack Coutu
 John Craxton
 Stella Rebecca Crofts 
 Theo Crosby

D
 Paul Lucien Dessau
 Mary Dobson
 Audrey Capel Doray
 Barbara Dorf

E
 Afi Ekong
 Aileen Mary Elliott
 John Elliott (architect)
 Ali Omar Ermes
 Mabel Esplin

F
 Germano Facetti
 Alfred Fairbank
 John Farleigh
 Celia Fiennes (artist)
 Ray Finch
 Peter Firmin
 Margaret Fitton
 Mary Fitzpayne
 Dennis Flanders
 Alan Fletcher (graphic designer)
 Victorine Foot
 Colin Forbes (graphic designer)
 Marcia Lane Foster
 Mary Fox
 Elizabeth Bertha Fraser
 Jane McAdam Freud
 Lucian Freud
 Anthony Froshaug

G
 Edith Galliner
 Pinchas Cohen Gan
 Ken Garland
 Robert Gibbings
 Eric Gill
 Phyllis Ginger
 Ablade Glover
 Paul Goble
 Peter Benjamin Graham
 James Ardern Grant
 John Greed
 Jane Greenwood
 Vivien Gribble
 Anthony Gross

H
 John Hackett (British Army officer)
 Xanthos Hadjisoteriou
 Kathleen Hale
 Barbara Hanrahan
 Jerry Harris
 Cicely Hey
 Min Hogg (1939–2019), writer on interior design 
 Richard Hollis
 Percy Horton
 Ralph Hotere

I
 David Imms
 Marjorie Incledon
 Neil Innes
 Gwyther Irwin

J
 Muriel Amy Jackson 
 Muriel Jackson
 Merlin James
 Faith Jaques
 Tam Joseph

K
 Helen Kapp
 Judith Kerr
 Morris Kestelman
 Grahame King
 Ethel Kirkpatrick

L
 Danny Lane
 John Lawrence (illustrator)
 Eric Lee-Johnson
 Mike Leigh
 John Vernon Lord
 Gillian Lowndes

M
 Enid Marx
 Eileen Mayo
 Daphne McClure
 Alex McDowell
 Althea McNish
 Colin McNaughton
 James Metcalf
 Peter Minshall
 Bill Moggridge
 Mona Moore
 Peter Mumford (lighting designer)
 Juan Muñoz
 David Myerscough-Jones

N
 John Napier (designer)
 Renee Nele
 William R. Newland
 Lucia Nogueira

O
 Ewart Oakeshott
 David Ogle
 Helen Oxenbury
 Lawson Oyekan

P
 Eric Parker (illustrator)
 Victor Pasmore
 Herry Perry
 Pollyanna Pickering
 Margaret Pilkington
 Wade Hampton Pipes
 Carl Plate
 Katherine Pleydell-Bouverie
 John Plumb
 Lilian Josephine Pocock
 Kim Poor
 Anthony Powell (designer)

R
 Rachel Reckitt 
 Dan Reisinger
 Lynette Roberts
 Noel Rooke
 Diana Ross (author)
 Michael Rothenstein

S
 Paul Sample (cartoonist)
 Helen Saunders
 Sid Scales
 Nick Schlee
 Stella Schmolle
 Miles Balmford Sharp
 Clare Shenstone 
 Posy Simmonds
 Richard Slee (artist)
 Heather Standring (born 1928), British illustrator
 Vivian Stanshall
 Joe Strummer
 Berenice Sydney

T
 Wendy Taylor
 Cecil Thomas
 Arthur Ralph Middleton Todd
 Caroline Townshend

U
 Marija Ujević-Galetović

W
 Monica Walker
 Mary Spencer Watson
 Sophia Wellbeloved
 Chris Welsby
 Veronica Whall
 Erica White
 Fred Williams
 Nigel Williams
 Ivor Williams
 Michael Wishart
 Wilfrid Wood
 Hilda Woolnough

Y
 Rachel Yallop
 Barbara Yung

Z

References

Central School of Art